Molla Kheyl-e Lai (also Romanized as Mollā Kheyl-e Lā’ī; also known as Lā’ī Mollā Kheyl and Mollā Kheyl) is a village in Zarem Rud Rural District, Hezarjarib District, Neka County, Mazandaran Province, Iran. At the 2006 census, its population was 147, in 42 families.

References 

Populated places in Neka County